This article details the Featherstone Rovers rugby league football club's 2019 season.

Fixtures and results

2019 Championship

References 

Featherstone Rovers
Featherstone Rovers
English rugby league club seasons